Kollanvayal is a village located in Aranthangi Taluk of Pudukkottai district in the state of Tamil Nadu, India. Kollanvayal is situated 2 km away from Silattur, 10 km away from sub-district headquarter Aranthangi and 25 km away from district headquarter Pudukkottai.

Geography
kollanvayal the names comes from 17'th century, small kingdoms operate this village to unofficially store the equipment's in that village because this village 4 sides covered with big ponds,
east side- valluvan kulam
west side - vinayagar kulam 
south side - murugan kulam 
north side - parangi kulam 
so anyone person come to this village they all cross the ponds after they will  enter the village. 
one more special thing best rain water harvesting to this village because all rain water directly go on all over the ponds .

Temples
Sri Muthumaari Amman Kovil, sri karpaga vinayagar kovil

Education
List of educational institutions in Kollanvayal:   
                                                   
Panchayat Union Elementary School 
every year more than 20 students complete the primary education on this school 
completed students directly go on nearby silattur higher secondary school . 
school old students take care of this school. they provide computer , projector ,sports equipment's.

References

Villages in Pudukkottai district